The Kaohsiung Rapid Transit Corporation (KRTC) is a corporation established by the municipal government of Kaohsiung, Taiwan to build and operate a rapid transit system for the municipality of Kaohsiung.

History
The corporation was established on 1 February 1999. The government signalled the start of this BOT (Build, Operate, Transfer) project with solicitation of private sector investment in the initial phase of a Kaohsiung Rapid Transit System-the Red and Orange Lines Construction Project. This first step demonstrated Kaohsiung Municipal Government's determination to propel Kaohsiung City and County towards a prosperous future. The Kaohsiung Rapid Transit System will not only fulfill a transport function but will also provide the framework and catalyst for the development of the fabric, the economy and the quality of life of the area, and for the promotion of community life, culture and art.

China Steel Corporation has been based in Kaohsiung for nearly 30 years. China Steel sponsored the establishment of the provisional office of the Kaohsiung Rapid Transit Corporation in February 1999 and lodged an application to invest in the project following the solicitation of the Kaohsiung Municipal Government. The main participants in the Kaohsiung Rapid Transit Corporation are: China Steel Corporation, Southeast Cement Corporation, RSEA Engineering Corporation, China Development Industrial Bank and Industrial Bank of Taiwan.

Following the public appraisal of the applications by the Kaohsiung Municipal Government, Kaohsiung Rapid Transit Corporation was selected on 26 May 1999, as one of the shortlisted applicants. On 10 May 2000, the Corporation was selected as the best applicant and concluded the relevant agreements and protocols with the Kaohsiung Municipal Government in August 2000. The raising of the initial capital stock was completed on 19 December 2000 and an inaugural meeting of the stockholders was held on the same day. Kaohsiung Rapid Transit Corporation obtained a company licence and was registered on 28 December 2000. The Corporation signed the" Construction and Operation Agreement" and" Development Agreement" with the Kaohsiung Municipal Government on 12 January 2001.

Organizational structures
 Chairperson
 President
 Planning Vice President
 Administration Department
 Public Affairs Department
 Purchasing Department
 Corporate Planning Department
 Finance and Accounting Department
 Business and Property Development Department
 Legal Office
 Operation Vice President
 Traffic Operation Department
 Maintenance Department
 LRT Operation and Maintenance Department
 Industrial Safety Department
 Information Management Office
 Research and Design Center

See also
 Kaohsiung Metro

External links

Kaohsiung Metro
Railway companies of Taiwan
Taiwanese companies established in 2000
Transport companies established in 2008